Muriel Guilbault (February 18, 1922 – January 3, 1952) was a Canadian actress and comedian. She signed the Refus Global, an artistic manifesto published in 1948, with the support of fifteen co-signers including painters Jean-Paul Riopelle, Claude Gauvreau, Pierre Gauvreau, Marcel Barbeau and Marcelle Ferron. She was the sister of actress .

References

External links
 Scene with Gratien Gelinas & Muriel Guilbaut in the play Tit-Coq, 1948
 Muriel Guilbault in the Agora Encyclopedia

1922 births
1952 deaths
20th-century Canadian actresses
Canadian women comedians
20th-century Canadian comedians
1952 suicides
Suicides in Quebec